Šestajovice may refer to:

 Šestajovice (Náchod District), a village in the Czech Republic
 Šestajovice (Prague-East District), a village in the Czech Republic